The Haishan Hall is a former military assembly hall in Anping District, Tainan, Taiwan.

Name
The hall was named Haishan taken from a mountain located in Pingtan Island, Fuzhou, Fujian.

History
The hall was built in 1684 shortly after Qing Dynasty took over Taiwan. It used to be the gathering venue for soldiers coming from Haishan District of Fujian Province. Those soldiers were stationed in Taiwan to defend the island on a three year rotational shift. In 1975, the building was acquired by Tainan City Government and converted into a museum in 1985.

Exhibitions
The hall exhibits the implements and charms designed to ward off evil. Various folk and cultural artifacts were also displayed.

Transportation
The hall is accessible by bus from Tainan Station of Taiwan Railways.

See also
Tianhou Temple (Anping)
List of tourist attractions in Taiwan

References

1684 establishments in Taiwan
Buildings and structures completed in 1684
Buildings and structures in Tainan
Tourist attractions in Tainan